Jorge Neira (born 9 November 1964) is a Spanish water polo player. He competed at the 1984 Summer Olympics and the 1988 Summer Olympics.

References

1964 births
Living people
Spanish male water polo players
Olympic water polo players of Spain
Water polo players at the 1984 Summer Olympics
Water polo players at the 1988 Summer Olympics
Place of birth missing (living people)